Oak Grove Township may refer to:

 Oak Grove Township, Lonoke County, Arkansas
Oak Grove Township, Benton County, Indiana
Oak Grove Township, Durham County, North Carolina
Oak Grove Township, Anoka County, Minnesota, now the city of Oak Grove

Township name disambiguation pages